Mehraban District is in Sarab County, East Azerbaijan province, Iran. At the 2006 National Census, its population was 30,752 in 7,115 households. The following census in 2011 counted 30,488 people in 8,221 households. At the latest census in 2016, the district had 28,244 inhabitants in 8,710 households.

References 

Sarab County

Districts of East Azerbaijan Province

Populated places in East Azerbaijan Province

Populated places in Sarab County